The 1916 Oklahoma Sooners football team represented the University of Oklahoma in the 1916 college football season. In their 12th year under head coach Bennie Owen, the Sooners compiled a 6–5 record (2–1 against conference opponents), and outscored their opponents by a combined total of 472 to 115.

No Sooners were recognized as All-Americans.

One Sooner received All-Southwest Conference honors: Willis Hott.

Schedule

References

Oklahoma
Oklahoma Sooners football seasons
Oklahoma Sooners football